The Office for Reform and Organizational Structure of the Central Military Commission  is the chief organ under the Central Military Commission of the People's Republic of China. It was founded on January 11, 2016, under Xi Jinping's military reforms. Lt. Gen. Qin Shengxiang served as its first director.

Heads
The formal title is Office for Reform and Organizational Structure.
Qin Shengxiang (2015–2015) (2015–2016, take at a part)
Du ke (2016.1.11–now)
Qin Shengxiang (2017-2017, moving)
He Renxue (2017-now)(Admchairman)

References

See also 

 Central Military Commission (China)
 2015 People's Republic of China military reform

Central Military Commission (China)
2016 establishments in China